The 1904 U.S. Open was the tenth U.S. Open, held July 8–9 at Glen View Club in Golf, Illinois, a suburb northwest of Chicago. Defending champion Willie Anderson won the third of his four U.S. Open titles, five strokes ahead of runner-up Gilbert Nicholls.

Anderson shared the lead with Stewart Gardner at 75 on Friday morning, but a 78 in the afternoon dropped him two behind after 36 holes. In the third round on Saturday morning, Fred Mackenzie shot 74 to take a two-stroke lead over Anderson and Gardner after 54 holes. Mackenzie and Gardner fell back in the afternoon; Mackenzie's 80 took him down to third and Gardner's 85 dropped him to sixth. Anderson had 72 for the lowest round in U.S. Open history, and his 303 also established a new championship low. Nicholls posted a 73 in the final round to finish ascend the leaderboard to second place.

Anderson was the first to successfully defend a U.S. Open title, and he would become the first to win three straight the following year, yet to be equaled.

For the first time, the U.S. Open adopted a cut after 36 holes, eliminating those more than fifteen shots behind tenth place.

Past champions in the field 

Source:

Did not play: Harry Vardon (1900), Willie Smith (1899), Fred Herd (1898), Joe Lloyd (1897).

Round summaries

First round
Friday, July 8, 1904 (morning)

Source:

Second round
Friday, July 8, 1904 (afternoon)

Source:

Third round
Saturday, July 9, 1904 (morning)

Source:

Final round
Saturday, July 9, 1904 (afternoon)

Source:

Amateurs: C. Egan (329), Hunter (331), Edwards (332), Phelps (348), Clingman (349), W. Egan (363)

References

External links
USGA Championship Database

U.S. Open (golf)
Golf in Illinois
U.S. Open (golf)
U.S. Open (golf)
U.S. Open (golf)
U.S. Open (golf)